The Universal Service Fund (USF) is a system of telecommunications subsidies and fees managed by the United States Federal Communications Commission (FCC) intended to promote universal access to telecommunications services in the United States. The FCC established the fund in 1997 in compliance with the Telecommunications Act of 1996. The FCC is a government agency that implements and enforces telecommunications regulations across the U.S. and its territories. The Universal Service Fund's budget ranges from $5–8 billion per year depending on the needs of the telecommunications providers. These needs include the cost to maintain the hardware needed for their services and the services themselves. The total 2019 proposed budget for the USF was $8.4 billion. The budget is revised quarterly allowing the service providers to accurately estimate their costs. As of 2019, roughly 60% of the USF budget was put towards “high-cost” areas, 19% went to libraries and schools, 13% was for low income areas, and 8% was for rural health care. In 2019 the rate for the USF budget was 24.4% of a telecom company's interstate and international end-user revenues.

While separate itemization is not required by the FCC, it is common for USF fees to be listed separately from other charges on a consumer's bill. Universal Service charges should not be confused with what are sometimes referred to in telephone company bills as "Federal Subscriber Line" charges, which are access fees charged by telecommunications companies, not the local or federal government.

Some have raised concerns about the future funding of the USF; despite falling taxable revenues, the size of the fund has increased from $1.2 billion in collections at 5.7% in 4Q 2000, to $2.2 billion in 4Q 2014 at 16.1%. Some believe that reclassifying broadband Internet access services under Title II of the 1996 Telecommunications Act would be followed by requiring ISPs to pay into the USF as a new source of revenue for the fund.  The FCC has made clear that the change does give it the power to do so, but will not require contributions on broadband Internet access revenues at this time, as the FCC will forbear from the contribution requirements in Section 254(d) of the Communications Act.

History

Calls for universal service

By 1913, AT&T had favored status from U.S. government, allowing it to operate in a noncompetitive economic environment in exchange for subjection to price and quality service regulation.  The government asserted that a monopolistic telephone industry would best serve the goal of creating a "universal" network with compatible technology country-wide for telephone consumers.  Regulators emphasized limits on profits, enforcing "reasonable" prices for service, setting levels of depreciation and investment for new technology and equipment, dependability and "universality" of service.  "Universal" was originally used by AT&T to mean, "interconnection to other networks, not service to all customers".  After years of regulation, the term came to include infrastructural development of telephony and service to everyone at a reasonable price.

Willis Graham Act of 1921 
The Willis Graham Act of 1921 was called into action in order to resolve pressing issues in the debate about the merits of interconnectivity of telecommunication. The act marks the first piece of legislation in the history of telecommunication to tackle the increasingly difficult challenges of the telecommunication industry in the 20th century. Before the Graham act was passed the commonly expressed opinion was, such as by the Senate Commerce Committee, that telephone service fit the definition of a natural monopoly.

The central practical problem, according to the committee, with the Willis Graham Act was competing telecommunication services serving one individual market. The act was in favor of a monopoly, which aimed to exempt competing telephone companies from the antitrust laws and allow them to unify the service by merging competing telecommunication service providers. The main principle behind the act was that there should be only one system in each community through which all users communicate. The focus was exclusively on local service rather than long-distance service, as no independent long-distance lines were able to compete with AT&T.

Communications Act of 1934

The Communications Act of 1934 includes in its preamble a reference to universal service.  It calls for "rapid, efficient, Nation-wide, and world-wide wire and radio communication service with adequate facilities at reasonable charges" to "all the people of the United States."  Communications Act of 1934 – Title I, Sec. 1 [47 U.S.C. 151] The Communications Act of 1934 first established the concept of making affordable basic telephone service available to everyone everywhere within a nation, state, or other governmental jurisdiction.

To comply with the act, AT&T began increasing the price of long-distance service to pay for universal service.  The act also established the FCC to oversee all non-governmental broadcasting, interstate communications, as well as international communication which originate or terminate in the United States.

Before the Telecommunications Act of 1996, the Universal Service Fund (USF) operated as a mechanism by which interstate long-distance carriers were assessed to subsidize telephone service to low-income households and high-cost areas in order to ensure that all the people in the United States have access to rapid, efficient, nationwide communications service with sufficient facilities at realistic charges.

Ozark Plan 
In the 1960s the telecommunication monopolies were shocked by new evolving technologies and competitions: new long-distance carriers and microwave networks were authorized. The predominant method used for financing subsidies for the underprivileged was to reallocate profit margins made by long-distance telecommunication to funds for local telephone connection. This process began in the mid 1960 and was institutionalized through the Ozark plan of 1970 into action. At the time of the institutionalization telephone penetration ranged between 85–95%.

Era of deregulation
There was a push for deregulating the telecommunications industry in the 1980s.  Under President Ronald Reagan, the FCC shifted its focus from "social equity to an economic efficiency objective," which it claimed was a primary purpose of the Communications Act of 1934. After AT&T was split up in 1984, universal service was still "supported by a system of above-cost access charges paid to local exchange companies."  This system was administered by the National Exchange Carrier Association. Increased competition and universal service were later legislatively addressed and codified with the Telecommunications Act of 1996.

Telecommunications Act of 1996

The Universal Service Fund was first codified in the Telecommunications Act of 1996, the first major rewrite of the Communications Act of 1934.  The act addresses new challenges and opportunities of the digital information age, with the goal of promoting an economic environment conducive for the growth of new information technology.  It also further developed the meaning and implementation of universal service.  The act calls for the creation of a joint federal-state board to make recommendations to the FCC on defining federal universal services and set time tables.  The act also set out immediate priorities of universal service.  These include quality and reasonably priced services, access to advanced telecommunication services, access for rural, low-income and high-cost regions, equitable and nondiscriminatory service, specific and predictable price structure, access of advanced telecommunication services for schools and health care and libraries (Sec. 254(b)(1)-(7)).  The act provided ability in the constantly changing telecommunication environment to periodically revisit and adjust universal service, while setting core principles (Sec. 254(c)).  The 1996 act also "mandated the creation of the universal service fund (USF) into which all telecommunications providers are required to contribute a percentage of their interstate and international end-user telecommunications revenues".

The major goals of Universal Service as mandated by the 1996 Act are as follows:

The 1996 Act states that all providers of telecommunications services should contribute to federal universal service in an equitable and nondiscriminatory manner; there should be specific, predictable, and sufficient Federal and State mechanisms to preserve and advance universal service; all schools, classrooms, health care providers, and libraries should, generally, have access to advanced telecommunications services; and finally, that the Federal-State Joint Board and the FCC should determine those other principles that, consistent with the 1996 Act, are necessary to protect the public interest.

Expansion of the fund into broadband

The concept of universal service may include other telecommunications-information services, mainly Internet access. Members of Congress have spoken out in favor of increased contribution to the USF from alternate sources.

Many of the services covered by the USF are related to traditional telephone technology.  There is a rising concern that more recent developments in telecommunications are just as important to the consumer as these older technologies. For example, consumers' subscriptions to traditional telephone services have fallen while their subscription rate to wireless services have been rising consistently.  Yet many cellular companies are likely to receive less funding under the new rules, which may reduce consumers' access to wireless services in areas of the country that have low populations.  Similarly, a question currently debated is whether access to broadband internet should be supported by the USF and if so, how best to fulfill such a large mandate without damaging the stability of the fund.  The Telecommunications Act of 1996 states that "advanced services" should be accessible to all Americans [Section 254(b)(3)].  One question is whether the providers of internet access should contribute to the fund like other companies that provide access to telecommunications, if such providers also want to draw from the fund. Supporters of including internet access in the Universal Service Fund include former Congressman Rick Boucher (D-VA)

Adding additional services to the fund has corporate support from major telecommunication companies, including Verizon and AT&T.  In March 2009, senior executives from Verizon Communications met with the House Subcommittee on Communications, Technology, and the Internet, providing recommendations for how best to proceed bringing broadband and mobile communication access to rural and unserved areas.  Citing reform to the Universal Service Fund as a means "to better serve rural America," Verizon recommended that a limit be set on the size of USF's high-cost fund, competitive bidding wars be employed to determine which company expand service to unserved areas, structure a "wire-center approach" model to replace statewide cost averaging, restructure how contributions to the USF are determined, and impose a deadline on the FCC for completion of their reform of inter-carrier compensation.

In October 2011 the FCC formally proposed a "Connect America Fund" to address these and other concerns. Reform finally arrived on October 27, 2011, when the FCC approved a six-year transfer process that would transition money from the Universal Service Fund to a new $4.5 billion a year Connect America Fund that will support the expansion of broadband services to areas that don't have broadband access yet.

In June, 2015, the FCC announced steps to modernize and reform Lifeline for broadband. Public comments were sought, with a deadline of August 31, 2015. The collection of public comments are available here. The NDIA played a critical role in providing comments and encouraging others to participate in the process.

On April 1, 2016, the Federal Communications Commission voted to expand the Lifeline telephone subsidy for low-income Americans to include Internet access.

On April 27, 2016, the full text of the ruling was released.

The key points of the decision include:
 Establishes a National Eligibility Verifier to verify eligible Lifeline subscribers. Eligibility will be based on participation in SNAP, Medicaid, SSI, Federal Public Housing Assistance, the Veterans *Pension benefit program, current Tribal qualifying programs, or those who can demonstrate income of less than 135 percent of the federal poverty guidelines.
 Defines minimum service standards for broadband and mobile voice services.
 Defines a five and half year transition plan to migrate from voice-focus to broadband-service-focus.
 Creates a Lifeline Broadband Subscriber designation process to encourage new service providers.
 Requires that Lifeline providers make available hotspot-enabled devices and Wi-Fi enabled devices when providing such devices for use with the Lifeline-supported service.
 Directs the Consumer and Governmental Affairs Bureau (CGB) to develop recommendations to address the non-price barriers to digital inclusion. In addition, CGB's plan should address best practices for increasing the digital skills of those already online and how those best practices can be spread throughout the digital inclusion community.

Components
USF's money is funded and then spent among the fund's four programs. The Connect America Fund provides funding for telephone companies that provide services to high-cost areas. The Low-Income Support "assists low-income customers by helping to pay for monthly telephone charges so that telephone service is more affordable." The E-Rate program "provides telecommunication services (e.g., local and long-distance calling, both fixed and mobile, high-speed data transmission lines), Internet access, and internal connections to eligible schools and libraries." Lastly, the Rural Health Care Support program "provides funding to eligible health care providers (HCPs) for telecommunications and broadband services necessary for the provision of health care." As far as State funds go, they have experienced inhibited growth. "The growth of State USF funds was tempered by reductions in Lifeline support and IAS funding, both driven by changes in federal regulation." There currently are forty-five states that provide some sort of State universal service support in addition to the existing federal funds. There are six states, however, that do not have any state funds. These include Alabama, Florida, Massachusetts, New Jersey, Tennessee, and Virginia.

The Universal Service Fund as made up of the following four constituent programs:

Connect America Fund
The largest and most complex of the four programs, the high cost program subsidizes telecommunications services in rural and remote areas. The program paid out $4.2 billion in subsidies to telecommunications companies in 2013, with a goal of making telecommunications affordable to rural and remote areas. The program has been criticized as wasteful, granting large sums of money to telecommunications companies while having little effect on access.

As part of the National Broadband Plan proposed in March 2010, the FCC proposed reorganizing the High Cost program into a new "Connect America Fund", which will include both voice and 4 Mbit/s internet connectivity. On October 27, 2011, the FCC approved a six-year transfer process that would transition the money from the Universal Service Fund High-Cost Program into the new $4.5 billion a year Connect America Fund, effectively putting an end to the USF High-Cost Fund by 2018.

In 2012, during "Phase I" of the Connect America Fund, $115 million in subsidies were given out to build out broadband in 37 states, with $71.9 million going to Frontier Communications and $35 million to Century Link, with AT&T and Verizon declining to participate. In 2013, also during "Phase I", CenturyLink accepted another $54 million, and AT&T accepted $100 million.

In March 2014, the FCC approved "Phase II" of the transition to the Connect America Fund, adding $1.8 billion a year in funding, and clarifying the specifics of the funding process. Under the framework the FCC approved, incumbent carriers have priority access to subsidies, but if the funds are declined, the funds are allocated by a competitive bidding process. The FCC also proposed upping the minimum speed requirement from 4Mbit/s to 10Mbit/s. In May 2014, the 10th circuit court of appeals upheld the shift in funds in the face of a legal challenge by telephone companies.

The Connect America Fund also includes the Mobility Fund, which is given to wireless carriers who expand service to underserved areas. "Phase I" of the Mobility Fund offered $300 million for a September 2012 round of auctions, and "Phase II" of the Mobility Fund plans to give out $500 million in annual support.

Low income (Lifeline)
Since 1985, the Lifeline program has helped low-income people pay for phone service; first landlines, then cellphones, and as of 2016 it also offers the option of Internet connectivity.  It provides a subsidy of up to $10.00 a month for Americans below 135% of the poverty line for this service.

As of 2012, 17 million households received a $9.25 subsidized discount through the program.  This was down to 12 million households by 2015. In 2013, the Lifeline program paid out $1.8 billion in subsidies to telephone companies; reduced to $1.5 billion by 2015. As the original program was set up to cover land lines, there was criticism of significant waste in the program. Residents of Native American Indian and Alaska Native tribal communities may qualify for enhanced Lifeline assistance (up to an additional $25.00) and expanded Link-Up support (up to an additional $70.00). States with their own programs may have their own eligibility guidelines.

On January 31, 2012, the Federal Communications Commission approved an order changing the Lifeline Program to reduce fraud and abuse. In April 2013 a hearing was held before the Subcommittee on Communications and Technology of the Committee on Energy and Commerce, U.S. House of Representatives, to explore issues relating to whether the program should be eliminated or placed under a budget cap, and if not, whether a freeze should be put in place until the reform measures currently underway are completed.

The Lifeline program is limited to one discount per household. A "household" includes anyone living at the same address "who share income(s) and household expenses".

Link-Up America assisted consumers with the installation costs of phone service. Link-Up program paid up to 50% or $30 of the telephone service installation fees, and provides up to $200 of one year, interest-free loans for any additional installation costs. On January 31, 2012, among other changes to the Lifeline Program, the FCC announced that they would be ending the Link-Up America Program, except on Indian reservations.

In 2016, Lifeline services were expanded to offer a broadband option.

On March 31, 2016 the Federal Communications Commission set a plan to reform the Lifeline program. The reform attempted to make the Lifeline program more modern and comprehensive to present day society. The 2016 Lifeline Modernization Order included that broadband service would be provided to low income households as an addition to the preexisting Lifeline program benefits. The Commission also set service standards in order to ensure the highest value for the Universal Service Fund. The FCC projected that the annual amount of mobile voice minutes available for each individual household per month will increase, while the cost of voice support will simultaneously decrease and will eventually become a completely unsubsidized service. The FCC also appointed a National Eligibility Verifier whose purpose would be to determine the eligibility of the independent subscribers to the program.

The expansion was frozen by the incoming Trump administration in February 2017, with incoming FCC commissioner Ajit Pai suspending the expansion of Lifeline. While current broadband providers are technically authorized to provide subsidized broadband, Pai, a former Verizon executive, claimed he could not point to a single company that actively provides broadband. New efforts to restart the expansion by the Biden administration have been unable to go forward due to new commissioners not being confirmed by the Senate as of September 2022.

In 2021, the CARES Act instituted the Emergency Broadband Benefit, which subsidized broadband service and equipment for households.

Companies
 Assurance Wireless
 Safelink Wireless
 Life Wireless

Rural health care
The rural health care program provides subsidies to health care providers for telehealth and telemedicine services, typically by a combination of video-conferencing infrastructure and high speed Internet access, to enable doctors and patients in rural hospitals to access specialists in distant cities at affordable rates. The Rural Health Care Support Mechanism allows rural health care providers to pay rates for telecommunications services similar to those of their urban counterparts, making telehealth services affordable. Over $417 million has been allocated for the construction of 62 statewide or regional broadband telehealth networks in 42 states and three U.S. territories under the Rural Health Care Pilot Program. In 2013, the rural health care program paid out $159 million.

There are three components of the Rural Health Care Program: Telecommunications Program, HCF Program, Pilot Program.

"The Telecommunications Program (formerly known as the Primary Program) provides discounts for telecommunications services for eligible health care providers (HCPs)."

"The Healthcare Connect Fund (HCF) Program is the newest component of the Rural Health Care Program. The HCF Program will provide a 65 percent discount on eligible expenses related to broadband connectivity to both individual rural health care providers (HCPs) and consortia, which can include non-rural HCPs (if the consortium has a majority of rural sites)."

"The Pilot Program provides funding for up to 85 percent of eligible costs of the construction or implementation of statewide and/or regional broadband networks. There are 50 active projects involving hundreds of health care providers (HCPs)."

Schools and Libraries Program (E-Rate)

The E-Rate program  provides subsidies for Internet access and general telecommunications services to schools and libraries. The subsidies typically pay 20% to 90% of costs based on need, with rural and low-income schools receiving the greatest subsidy. In 2013, the E-Rate program paid out $2.2 billion. USAC has more than $37.3 billion in E-Rate funding commitments and $26.8 billion in E-Rate funding disbursements issued to schools and libraries nationwide through the E-Rate from 1998 to 2013. Every year since 2010, the Wireline Competition Bureau announces the funding cap for the E-Rate program to adhere to the current needs of schools and libraries telecommunications.

"The Eligible Services List (ESL) for each funding year provides guidance on the eligibility of products and services under the Schools and Libraries Program." In 2015, USAC outlined two specific categories for grouping the ESL, and one category for miscellaneous services.
 "Category One
 Data Transmission Services and Internet Access, and Voice Services
 Category two
 Internal Connections, Managed Internal Broadband Services, and Basic Maintenance of Internal Connections
 Miscellaneous"

Starting in the 2011 funding year, the different types of schools eligible to receive benefits now include:
 "School on Tribal lands
 Schools that serve children with physical, cognitive, and behavioral disabilities
 Schools that serve children with medical needs
 Juvenile justice schools, where eligible
 Schools with 35 percent or more students eligible for the National School Lunch Program (NSLP)."

Administration

Universal Service Administrative Company

Following the Telecommunications Act of 1996 and the subsequent creation of the Universal Service Fund, the FCC designated the independent American nonprofit corporation named the "Universal Service Administrative Company" (Universal Service Administrative Co) to manage the contribution of revenue to and distribution of funding from the Universal Service Fund. The Schools and Libraries Corporation and the Rural Health Care Corporation were merged into the USAC on January 1, 1999. The USAC is a subsidiary of the National Exchange Carrier Association, and is governed by a 19-person board of directors representing various stakeholder interests and carries out rules adopted by the FCC. The company has 356 employees.

USAC reports quarterly revenue projections detailing what contributions are expected and detailing what actions are taken in the expansion and bolstering of universal service. The USAC receives contributions from all companies providing interstate and international telephone and Voice over Internet Protocol (VoIP) service.  Contributors send payments based on projected quarterly earnings. The FCC does not require companies to charge their customers for these contributions – this funding decision is left up to the individual companies. This revenue is deposited into a central fund, from which the USAC distributes money to the four central services at the core of the USF: High Cost, Low Income, Schools and Libraries, and Rural Health Care.

Providers of telecommunication services are legally required to contribute to the Universal Service Fund. "The USAC collects revenue data from USF contributors on the FCC Form 499-A (Annual Telecommunications Reporting Worksheet) and FCC Form 499-Q (Quarterly Telecommunications Reporting Worksheet)." The USAC is responsible for estimating how much money is needed for the USF program. The USAC provides a "demand filing," to the Federal Communications Commission (FCC) each quarter in its FCC Filings.

In the past, only long-distance companies made contributions to support the federal Universal Service Fund. The Telecommunications Act of 1996 expanded the types of companies contributing to the Universal Service Fund. Currently, all telecommunications companies that provide service between states, including long-distance companies, local telephone companies, wireless telephone companies, paging companies, and payphone providers, are required to contribute to the federal Universal Service Fund. Carriers providing international services also must contribute to the Universal Service Fund. In June 2006, the FCC voted to require providers of VoIP services to contribute to the Universal Service Fund the same way traditional telephone services had been contributing.

While the USAC cannot act without Congressional approval, it can make recommendations. USAC recommendations have resulted in expanding telecommunication resources, particularly broadband Internet and mobile access to schools and libraries, and recognizing VoIP as a form of interstate and international communication, which requires those companies providing VoIP services to contribute to the USF.

Federal Communications Commission

The FCC oversees the USAC's administration of the Universal Service Fund, and institutes reforms as it sees fit. Although the fund is limited by the scope of US law, (mainly the 1996 Telecommunications Act)
the FCC has played a part in making several changes to the fund, including shifting funds from the high cost program towards broadband expansion. Under the FCC, there is an Enforcement Bureau that investigates and pursues the violators of the Act of 1996 and any Commissions rules.

Funding
All providers of telecommunication service support the Universal Service Fund. These providers contribute to the fund "based on their interstate and international end-user telecommunications revenues." This percentage of contribution is "adjusted every quarter based on projected demand for Universal Service funding." As of the end of 2019, telecommunication companies were required to contribute 25% of their revenue to the fund. Currently, the FCC has proposed to lower this to 21.2% for the first quarter of 2020. However, not all companies cover the charge themselves. Instead they bill their customers to make up the amount. While companies are not required to charge the customer, they must come up with the funds and many service providers find this to be their solution. The contributions are collected by the Universal Service Administrative Company and disbursed towards four programs that the federal USF supports, as directed by the FCC.

State universal service funds

Many US States have their own universal service funds, with budget and administration independent of the much larger federal fund. Examples include in California, New York, Wisconsin, and Texas.

Controversy
Wide disagreement over the nature and administration of the USF exists in telecommunications policy circles. Such disagreements fragment traditional partisan alliances in the United States Congress. Fears continue to abound about what such subsidies mean, and how it will affect telecommunications in the long run. Critics of the USF programs argue that there are many macro-level problems which are caused by the ¨systematic design problems that have significant adverse impact on consumers and the carriers providing service.¨ Service providers and consumers alike are disproportionately granted subsidies or billed because of the lack of organization among the four programs. Discussions continue over whether the USF should be used to provide services such as broadband internet access. Plans to subsidize internet service providers has led to backlash from traditional telecommunications carriers. Traditional carriers argue that “the relevant provisions of the 1996 Act do not give the FCC carte blanche to play regulatory Robin Hood with their universal service contributions.” Because ISP's and traditional telecommunications carriers often provide similar services, the USF may “violate[] the pro-competitive precepts of the 1996 Act."

Concerns about 2011 changes
In 2011, the FCC made material changes in the USF program, largely benefiting the largest traditional telephone companies in the country, which now have double the access to funding than they had before those changes.  Smaller traditional and wireless carriers were given reduced access to support going forward, which means that unless the FCC makes future changes, the country will depend in large measure on two carriers to carry out broadband deployment and ongoing operations in rural areas in the future, and in very rural areas of the country, service may diminish.

Waste and fraud
The issue of waste and fraud, as with many government programs, has been addressed as well. Gilroy stated, "The ability to ensure that only eligible services are funded, that funding is disbursed at the proper level of discount, that alleged services have been received, and the integrity of the competitive bidding process is upheld have been questioned". Improved auditing of particularly the E-rate program has been addressed.

There have been multiple cases of waste and fraud throughout disbursement of subsidies from the Universal Service Fund. There is some concern on the lag time between application, approval, and actual receipt of funds. In terms of fraud, some school officials have been bribed by contractors working with corporations so that they use subsidies to purchase computer equipment from said corporation. In addition, some beneficiaries inaccurately report costs to inflate their subsidies amount. In terms of waste, some equipment subsidized by the USF has been left unused for several years.

An investigation into potential fraud in 2004 revealed that contractors working with Hewlett-Packard bribed school officials. Hewlett-Packard wanted the schools to use subsidies provided by the fund to purchase computer equipment from Hewlett-Packard. The second example of fraud was when "Sandwich Isles Communication purposely inflated and inaccurately reported money to receive inflated subsidies."

Critics continue to raise concerns in regards to the wastefulness of the fund. For example, "$5 million worth of equipment purchased by Chicago public schools with E-rate funds was left unused in a warehouse for years." Lastly, a problem that has plagued the program is the long lag time between the overall application of the programs and the approval.

The FCC has responded to issues of waste and fraud in the USF. In an attempt to combat them, the FCC conducted an investigation into the Lifeline program which revealed "serious weaknesses in federal safeguards, allowing providers to indiscriminately override checks that are supposed to prevent wasteful and fraudulent activities." As a result, Ajit Pai, current FCC commissioner withdrew some Lifeline subsidies "to come up with a better way to vet them for potential waste, fraud and abuse."  Pai argued that it is necessary to halt some funds towards programs riddled with fraud because "putting the designations on hold gives the FCC the chance to make sure the process is legally defensible and to avoid potentially stranding customers if the courts ultimately deem the process unlawful".

In early 2018, the FCC Chairman Ajit Pai proposed a plan to scale back the USF's Lifeline program. Pai claimed the proposed cutbacks would encourage business investment in low income communities, reducing the need for the government spending on the program. Pai also referenced the fraud that surrounds the usage of the program as a reason to scale back Lifeline. If passed and put into effect, this cutback would end Lifeline access for 8 million people, which accounts for about 70% of the program's recipients. In the American territory of Puerto Rico, this would translate to about 17% of its population that would lose access.

Nine U.S. Senators issued a joint letter opposing the cutbacks, contending that, "The Lifeline Program is essential for millions of Americans who rely on subsidized internet access to find jobs, schedule doctor's appointments, complete their school assignments, interface with the government, and remain connected in a digital economy." The FCC must now decide between the high cost and the USF's goal for "universal access" with this program.

This cut to the Lifeline program prevents other smaller companies known as resellers from "buying network capacity from big telecom providers and then selling it back to low-income consumers at cheaper rates." This is problematic for the majority of Lifeline customers who rely on those cheaper rates.

The current administration looks to be opposed to this program as they feels it is wasteful of taxpayer money. Since 2017, there has been a 21% decrease in the number of people being assisted by this program. In 2017 just under 11 million people were being assisted whereas now in 2019, slightly under 9 million people are receiving assistance. It is estimated 2.3 million people are no longer enrolled in this program.

The USF has some issues in dealing with insufficient controls over determining who qualifies for funding, and limited auditing practices that are supposed to ensure that telecommunication companies are not overpaying or underpaying their dues to the fund.

The USF is able to reward those living in rural or impoverished areas who are capable of paying the entire cost of personal telecommunication services. Critics argue that inconsistent and asymmetrical audits allow for wealthy consumers to avoid triggering some USF financial burdens.  Wealthy landowners in rural estates decide to utilize USF subsidies and pay a fraction of what they can realistically afford.

Critics note that reimbursing carriers on a “‘cost-plus’ basis” creates “incentives to increase rather than decreas[e] costs” By reimbursing “carriers for the full cost of infrastructure development plus 11.25 percent of those costs in profit,” the fund may expose itself to exploitation.

Concerns about 2018 changes 
In May 2018, the FCC moved $8 billion from a private bank to the US Treasury. This anticipated move caused an uproar from FCC Democratic commissioners who were concerned about the money being allocated to large corporations instead of the citizens. FCC commissioner, Jessica Rosenworcel stated that this move "sacrificed $50 million in annual interest that could have been used to support rural broadband, telemedicine & internet in schools." Although lawmakers and commissioners claimed that this move was unexpected, there was a letter previously written to the General Accountability Office (GAO) in January 2018 asking for a review on the plan to review the funds. The GAO claimed that the USF funds are not regulated as intensively as other government funds, so this move was an attempt to "improve management and oversight of the funds."

After the 2018 USF changes, VoIP service providers are now required to provide funds for the USF. For example, Vonage must charge an additional 10.10% fee. However, they are exempt from the cost of using the Internet for information transport whereas DSL internet providers and modern cable services must burden the cost. This expands cost distortion to long-distance telephone providers and it raises the cost of telecommunications service for more consumers.

On May 21, the FCC issued an order that prohibited USF programs from buying equipment from Chinese telecommunications companies Huawei and ZTE. These companies are considered a risk to national security by American intelligence agencies. National Economic Council Director Larry Kudlow commented that the Trump Administration are ¨aware of security issues, sanctions issues, technology theft issues, et cetera.¨

Declining revenues
The rapidly changing interstate and international telecommunications markets can quickly and unpredictably bring about changes in USF funding levels. Dorothy Attwood of the FCC Wireline Competition Bureau stated, "One striking development that we've witnessed in the interstate marketplace is the steady decline of interstate revenues. Although traditional long-distance revenues grew consistently between 1984 and 1997, they're now in a period of steady decline". She pointed out that competition in the interstate long-distance market, wireless substitution, and bundling of service packages that blur traditional service categories are all reducing revenues that serve to finance the USF. Service providers simply transferred the cost to customers in the form of a long-distance surcharge to make up for reduced revenue. While the expenditures of the USF have increased since its inception, in part due to expansion of support paid to competitive providers, the revenues on which contributions are made – interstate and international telecommunications revenues – have become increasingly more difficult for contributors to identify as a result of evolution of services offered.  Overall revenues reported by telecommunications companies have steadily increased, if information service revenues are included. However, the revenues for these services are no longer subject to contribution.

Proposed reform

Expanding revenue sources
Debate over the Universal Service Fund has consistently involved the scope of the funding, which technology types and companies should fund the program, which groups should be eligible for benefits, and the need to clean up waste and fraud in the program. Proposals have been made to increase the number of sources from which universal service fund is collected. This could include expanding contributions to include intrastate telephone services (calls within single states), voice over IP (computer-to-computer calls), and information services such as broadband, and increasing contribution requirements from wireless communication providers.

Failed legislation
A draft proposal of the Telecommunications Act of 2005 was the subject of hearings in Congress. The proposal outlined a significant restructuring of the Telecommunications Act of 1996, ultimately the House of Representatives passed a bill, the Communications Opportunity, Promotion, and Enhancement Act of 2006 (COPE – H.R.5252.RS, S.2686).  The bill was sent from the House to the Senate, where subsequent readings left it awaiting a legislative action.  Under the proposed restructuring of the Telecommunications Act of 1996, greater emphasis on the wide availability of broadband and mobile access would be considered.  Additionally, consideration of revenue contribution to the Universal Service Fund would be radically revised, given that the creation of obligatory broadband and mobile communication access would require a wide range of broadband, mobile, and Voice over Internet Protocol (VoIP) service providers to contribute a portion of their revenue to the fund.  Lastly, the Act urged an FCC consideration of the universal service structure. The bill was not passed.

In January 2007, Senator Ted Stevens (R-AK) sponsored a bill (the Universal Service for Americans Act) that would increase universal service tax base to include broadband ISPs and VoIP providers, to fund broadband deployment in rural and low-income regions of the country. This bill was referred to committee, but as no further action was taken on it by the 110th Congress, the bill never became law. Since then the only congressional action has been H.R. 176, introduced by Congressman Bob Latta (R-OH) on February 13, 2009, which states that, "in order to continue aggressive growth in our Nation's telecommunications and technology industries, the United States Government should 'Get Out of the Way and Stay Out of the Way'." The bill died in committee.

On July 22, 2010, the Universal Service Reform Act of 2010 was introduced by Representatives Boucher (D-Va) and Terry (R-NE). The measure is intended to improve and modernize the USF by reining in the size of the fund and promoting broadband deployment.

Supporting natural monopolies 

The status quo only benefits powerful telecommunications companies. In the interest of reducing waste, limited support to a monopoly universal service provider for each territory has been considered. Wireless technology is increasingly favored by consumers, and can cover a single territory often for less than landline technology. However, wireless has traditionally been a competitive industry, which has resulted in a variety of innovative services for consumers, but means that supporting wireless companies requires a complex understanding of how to allocate funding on a shared basis, in order to avoid injury to the positive forces of competition.

Expanding rural broadband 
In March 2016, the FCC unanimously voted to provide $20 billion over the next 10 years in "support for small carriers." The previous FCC chairman Tom Wheeler under the Obama Administration implemented this reform. The FCC will be offering the fund $20 billion over the next 10 years to support service in "high cost areas." This reform is a modernization of the program support of broadband in "high cost areas." It will target communities that most need support. Reformation of the Lifeline program included minimum service requirement standards implemented to ensure that consumers benefited the most from the program. Pai and the proponents of the budget cuts claim that the Lifeline program is being abused by resellers claiming that some recipients listed in the databases are deceased or do not exist. Pai's hope is that this budget cut will stimulate the free market and allow existing broadband networks to expand their infrastructure into the rural areas. These small carriers are also known as "rate-of-return" carriers; these carriers have made significant progress in recent years but many still do not have access to "terrestrial fixed broadband." The reform is made up of three main elements: "Modernizes Existing Universal Service Program for Rate-of-Return Carriers", "Create Two Paths to a 'Connect America Fund' for Rate-of Return Carriers" and "Increase Fiscal Responsibility in the Universal Service Fund."

In 2017, new FCC chairman under the Trump Administration, Ajit Varadaraj Pai, plans to keep rural areas a priority. He wants to bridge "the digital divide between rural and urban areas" by working on "expanding broadband options". Pai believes that there is waste occurring between the private and public sectors as private capital is already being given to areas in order to build out networks. However, some of these areas are still being subsidized. Pai intends to make sure that broadband accessibility is included in an infrastructure bill to come. This decision from Pai is reducing the impact of the Lifeline program, some even speculating that he may eventually dismantle the entire program.

Out of the four USF programs, the Lifeline program is currently the only one without a strict budget cap. Lifeline can go over its current budget as long as the FCC provides a reason as to why they need to spend more money. This allows the FCC to subsidize communication services to people with low income. As stated above, this will most likely change as the FCC is reviewing Pai's proposal on November 16, 2017 to set a budget cap on the Lifeline program.

See also
 E-Rate
 National broadband plans from around the world
 Rural electrification
 National Exchange Carrier Association

References

External links
 FCC website
 Universal Access (Free Press)
 Universal Service Administrative Company
 About the USAC 
 Schools & Libraries
 High Cost
 Low Income
 Rural Healthcare
 Committee on Energy and Commerce
 LifelineSupport.org - official page for info on the program
 Lifeline National Verifier - official page for verifying eligibility

United States communications regulation
Non-profit organizations based in the United States
Federal Communications Commission